The Big Blow may refer to:

Storms
 An 1880 storm on the Great Lakes
 Great Lakes Storm of 1913
 Great Olympic Blowdown of 1921
 Columbus Day Storm of 1962

Other instances
 The Big Blow novel (2000)
 "The Big Blow Out" episode of Teenage Mutant Ninja Turtles
 Operation Big Blow in World War II
 "The Big Blow-Up episode of Arthur
 "The Big Blow Up" episode of ChalkZone
 An altercation between Billy Joe Mantooth and Dan Fowler (1981)